Luz Clarita is a Mexican telenovela produced by Mapat L. de Zatarain for Televisa. The series is a remake of Andrea Celeste and Chispita. It premiered on Canal de las Estrellas on 30 September 1996 and ended on 21 February 1997.

The series stars Verónica Merchant, César Évora, and Daniela Luján, co-stars Ximena Sariñana, Aitor Iturrioz, and Paty Díaz, with Frances Ondiviela, Sussan Taunton, and Lili Garza as the villains.

Plot
Luz Clarita (Daniela Luján) is a sweet little girl who wants to find her mother and in her search will live through moments of great sadness and joy. Thanks to a series of coincidences, Mariano de la Fuente (César Évora)'s family decides to open the doors of their home to the little orphan and although at the start it would seem that said girl only had come to create chaos in their lives, little by little they realize that she has arrived in order to teach them, the children and the adults the most important of lessons: that love is the essence of happiness.

The process is not easy because Luz Clarita has her own problems: she is convinced that she is not an orphan, that her mother did not die as all seems to indicate, but that she is somewhere waiting to be reunited with Luz Clarita, and armed only with her faith, and with the silent complicity of Padre Salvador (Alejandro Tommasi), she is given the task of searching for her mother.

With the de la Fuente family, Luz Clarita creates problems with little Mariela who sees in her a potent rival, and since the first day she dedicates herself to making Luz Clarita's life impossible.  In this house she meets Natalia (Paty Díaz), the young servant who is secretly in love with José Mariano de la Fuente (Aitor Iturrioz); Luz Clarita decides to help the two to realize their love for one another, and in Natalia she finds support and care.

In the course of her life, Luz Clarita encounters Soledad (Verónica Merchant), a young woman with a mysterious past who coincidentally arrives to work in orphanage on the very day that Luz Clarita leaves to go to the mansion of the de la Fuentes, and for whom Luz Clarita comes to feel a special affection, so much that, seeing the immediate feelings that Soledad and Mariano exhibit upon meeting, she decides to try to unite them.

The love and goodness of Luz Clarita encounter serious obstacles, like Brígida (Lili Garza), the strict housekeeper at the de la Fuente mansion, where alongside innocence there are always dark interests, like those of Bárbara (Frances Ondiviela) and Erika (Sussan Taunton), a pair of cocky women who are determined to conquer Mariano and José Mariano at all costs.

In addition to all of these obstacles, Luz Clarita fights to find happiness at her mother's side.  While this all happens, Luz Clarita illuminates the lives of all those who have the fortune to meet her, as the darkness disappears with just a little bit of Luz Clarita (clear light).

Cast

 Verónica Merchant as Soledad Martínez/Rosario Vertis vda. de Gonzalo
 César Évora as Mariano de la Fuente
 Daniela Luján as Luz Clara Gonzalo Vertis "Luz Clarita"
 Ximena Sariñana as Mariela de la Fuente
 Aitor Iturrioz as José Mariano de la Fuente
 Paty Díaz as Natalia
 Frances Ondiviela as Bárbara Vda. de Lomelí
 Alejandro Tommasi as Father Salvador Uribe
 Sussan Taunton as Erika Lomelí
 Miguel Pizarro as Roque
 Lili Garza as Brígida
 Tomás Goros as Anselmo
 Elsa Cárdenas as Hada Reina
 Adriana Acosta as Panchita
 Gerardo Murguía as Servando
 Evangelina Martínez as Prudencia
 Lucero Lander as Sister Caridad
 Julio Mannino as Bruno
 Margarita Isabel as Verónica
 Eleazar Gómez as Martín "El Chanclas"
 Esteban Franco as Arnulfo
 José María Torre as Israel
 Rocío Sobrado as Belinda
 Eva Calvo as Cata
 Graciela Bernardos as Mrs. Director
 Sagrario Baena as Hortensia
 Raúl Azkenazi as Rústico Domínguez
 Liza Echeverría as Dana
 Maleni Morales as Pilar
 Roxana Saucedo as Graciela Stockton
 Miguel Arteaga
 Ninel Conde
 José Antonio Marros
 Sabine Moussier

Awards

See also
 Carita de ángel – a 2000 Mexican children's soap opera with similar storyline

References

External links

1996 telenovelas
Mexican telenovelas
1996 Mexican television series debuts
1997 Mexican television series endings
Television series about orphans
Television shows set in Mexico
Televisa telenovelas
Children's telenovelas
Mexican television series based on Argentine television series
Spanish-language telenovelas